The 2018 Réunion Premier League is the 69th season of the Réunion Premier League, the professional league for association football clubs in Réunion, since the league's establishment in 1950. The season started on 17 March and concluded on 16 December 2018.

Standings
Final table.

  1.JS Saint-Pierroise              26  18  5  3  61-13  85  Champions
  2.SS Jeanne d'Arc (Le Port)       26  18  4  4  35-14  84
  3.AS Excelsior (Saint-Joseph)     26  14  6  6  49-22  74
  4.Saint-Denis FC                  26  11  8  7  40-26  67
  5.US Sainte-Marienne              26  10 10  6  27-24  65  [-1]
  6.La Tamponnaise                  26  11  4 11  27-29  63
  7.AS Saint-Louisienne             26   9  8  9  31-35  61
  8.AS MJC Sainte-Suzanne           26   7 11  8  30-30  58
  9.AS Marsouins (Saint-Leu)        26   7  8 11  19-33  55  [2 1 0 1 1 1-1 5]
 10.Saint-Pauloise FC               26   8  5 13  27-47  55  [2 1 0 1 1 1-1 5]
 11.AF Saint-Louis                  26   7  7 12  19-36  54
  - - - - - - - - - - - - - - - - - - - - - - - - - - - - -
 12.SS Capricorne (Saint-Pierre)    26   5 10 11  15-28  51  Relegation Playoff
 ----------------------------------------------------------
 13.AJ Petite-Ile                   26   4  7 15  26-36  45  Relegated
 14.OSCA Léopards (Saint-André)     26   4  5 17  22-55  43  Relegated

Top scorers

References

Football competitions in Réunion
Premier League
Reunion